Aureliano Cândido Tavares Bastos ( – ) was a Brazilian politician, writer and journalist. He was a supporter of federalism within the Empire of Brazil. The familial surname is Tavares Bastos.

Early life  
Tavares Bastos was the first of six children born to Brazilian politician , and Rosa Candida Araujo. He attended the University of São Paulo Law School and graduated in 1858 at age 20. He followed this by earning a doctorate in law in 1859.

Political career 
In 1860, Tavares Bastos was elected to the legislature for the province of Alagoas. In 1861, after openly disagreeing with the Minister of the Navy, Tavares Bastos was dismissed from his official position as Secretary of the Navy. In 1864, Tavares Bastos was re-elected deputy and attended the Mission Hail by the River Plate as secretary.

Death and legacy 
In 1874 Tavares Bastos travelled to Europe due to his poor health. His body was buried in the city of Rio de Janeiro, where he lived much of his life, on 2 May 1876. Rio's Tavares Bastos favela is named after him.

Views 
Tavares Bastos was a supporter of liberalism. His ideas were influenced by American missionary James Cooley Fletcher, and thinkers such as John Stuart Mill, Alexis de Tocqueville and Alexander Hamilton. As such advocated the separation of church and state and even the immigration of Protestants in the region.

Published works 
The book consists of letters that deal with issues such as administrative centralization, the opening of the Amazon River to navigation, freedom of navigation cabotage and communications with the United States. In 1870, he published A província (English: The Province), which opposed the centralization of government. In 1872, he published A situação e o Partido Liberal (English: The Situation and the Liberal Party), and in 1873 studies on Electoral Reform.

Recognition 
Tavares Bastos was the one of the original patrons of the Academia Brasileira de Letras, holding the 35th seat.

References

External links 
 

1839 births
1875 deaths
Brazilian politicians
Patrons of the Brazilian Academy of Letters
Brazilian journalists